Hansen or Hanssen is a Scandinavian patronymic surname, meaning son of Hans. As of 2008, it is the third most common surname in Denmark, shared by 4.3% of the population. As of 2000, Hansen is the single most common surname in Norway, not counting spelling variations such as Hanssen, which are also quite common. In the Faroe Islands Hansen is the second most common surname, while in the North German federal states of Schleswig-Holstein and Hamburg Hansen is the third and fifth most common surname, respectively.
In Sweden the parallel form is Hansson. The frequent occurrences of Hansen as a surname outside Denmark, Norway and Schleswig-Holstein is due to immigration, though Nordic immigrants to English-speaking countries often anglicised their names to Hanson in order to accommodate English orthographic rules.

Geographical distribution
As of 2014, 33.5% of all known bearers of the surname Hansen were residents of Denmark (frequency 1:28), 31.6% of the United States (1:1,933), 10.5% of Norway (1:83), 10.2% of Germany (1:1,330), 2.3% of Canada (1:2,658), 2.3% of Australia (1:1,773), 1.3% of Sweden (1:1,325) and 1.2% of South Africa (1:7,460).

In Denmark, the frequency of the surname was higher than national average (1:28) in the following regions:
 1. Region Zealand (1:19)
 2. Region of Southern Denmark (1:22)

In Norway, the frequency of the surname was higher than national average (1:83) in the following regions:
 1. Northern Norway (1:35)
 2. Svalbard and Jan Mayen (1:42)
 3. Eastern Norway (1:79)
 4. Southern Norway (1:82)

Notable people
Notable people with the surname include:

Arts and entertainment

Aime Hansen (born 1962), Estonian poet, writer, and artist
Al Hansen (1927–1995), American artist
Andrew Hansen (born 1974), Australian comedian
Anna Hansen, Canadian chef
Asta Hansen (1914–1962), Danish stage and film actress
Beck Hansen, (born 1970), American alternative musician known as Beck
Betsy Hansen (dates unknown), woman who charged actor Errol Flynn with statutory rape in 1942
B. Andreas Bull-Hansen (born 1972), Norwegian fantasy writer and former championship weightlifter
Carl G. O. Hansen (1871–1960), Norwegian-American journalist, musician and author
Carl William Hansen (1872–1936), Danish author
Chris Hansen (born 1959), American journalist
Christian Frederik Hansen (1756–1845), Danish architect
Constantin Hansen (1804–1880), Danish artist
Courtney Hansen (born 1974), American model and television personality
C. & V. Hansen (1906–2001 & 1900–1992), Danish comics authors
Dinah-Jane Hansen (born 1997), Singer of Female American group Fifth Harmony
David Hansen (born 1968), actor, director, and playwright
Derek Hansen (born 1944), Australian writer
Erhardine Adolphine Hansen (1815–1893), Danish actress
Erik Hansen (1927–2016), Danish architect
Erik Fosnes Hansen (born 1965), Norwegian author
Gunnar Hansen (1947–2015), Icelandic-American actor
Ib Hansen, pseudonym of Austrian poet H. C. Artmann (1921–2000)
Hans Matthison-Hansen, Danish organist and composer (1807-1890)
Johan Matthison-Hansen, (aka Gottfred) Danish organist and composer (1832-1909) 
Jerry Hansen (1927–2012), Ghanaian highlife musician
Joachim Hansen (1930–2007), German actor
Johannes Hansen (1903–1995), Danish sculptor
Joseph Hansen (1923–2004), author
Joseph Hansen (1842–1907), Belgian dancer
Kai Hansen (born 1963), German power metal musician
Karl Gustav Hansen (1914–2002), Danish silversmith, designer
Liane Hansen (1951-, American radio journalist and radio show host
Lisa M. Hansen, American producer, actress, assistant director, and writer
Lys Hansen (born 1936), Scottish artist
Mary Hansen (1966–2002), Australian guitarist and singer
Max Hansen (1897–1961), Danish singer
Peter Hansen (1921–2017), American actor
Ron Hansen (born 1947), American novelist, essayist, and professor

Politics
Ann Hansen (born 1953), Canadian anarchist and bomber
Bernie Hansen (1944–2021), American politician in Chicago politics
Bertha Lee Hansen (1882-1966), American politician from Minnesota
Charles Robert Hansen (1909-2000), American businessman and politician from Minnesota
Clifford Hansen (1912–2009), American politician from Wyoming
Colin Hansen (born 1952), Canadian politician from British Columbia
Connor Hansen (1913–1987), American jurist from Wisconsin
Dave Hansen (born 1947), American politician from Wisconsin
Eva Kjer Hansen (born 1964), Danish politician
Flemming Hansen (1939–2021), Danish politician
George V. Hansen (1930–2014), American politician from Idaho
Glenna Hansen (born 1956), Canadian Inuvialuit politician
Goeff Hansen (born 1959), American politician from Michigan
H. C. Hansen (1906–1960), Danish Prime Minister (1955–1960)
Hans Peter Hansen (politician) (1872–1953), Danish journalist and politician
Holger Hansen (1929–2015), Danish politician and academic
James V. Hansen (1932–2018), American politician from Utah
Jørgen Peder Hansen (1923–1994), Danish politician
Joseph Hansen (1910–1979), American Trotskyist and leader of the American Socialist Workers Party
Merle Hansen (1919–2009), American farmer, Founder of the North American Farm Alliance
Peter Hansen (UN) (born 1941), Danish UN official
Robert W. Hansen (1911–1977), American jurist from Wisconsin
Ron Hansen (born 1943), Canadian politician from Ontario
Stephanie Hansen (born 1961), American politician from Delaware
Urban Hansen (1908–1986), Danish politician
Victor Davis Hanson (born 1953), American political commentator

Science
Alvin Harvey Hansen (1887–1975) American economist
Emil Christian Hansen (1842–1910), Danish fermentation physiologist
Gerhard Armauer Hansen (1841–1912), Norwegian physician, discover of the cause of leprosy
Hans Jacob Hansen (1855–1936), Danish zoologist
James E. Hansen (born 1941), American climatologist
Julie Vinter Hansen (1890–1960), Danish astronomer
Per Brinch Hansen (1938–2007), Danish computer scientist
Peter Andreas Hansen (1795–1874), Danish astronomer
Siegfried Hansen (1912–2002), Danish engineer
Thomas Blom Hansen (born 1958), Danish anthropologist
W.W. Hansen (1909–1949), American physicist

Sport
Abraham Løkin Hansen (born 1959), Faroese footballer (né Hansen)
Adam Hansen (born 1981), Australian road cyclist
Adrian Hansen (born 1971), South African squash player
Alan Hansen (born 1955), Scottish footballer
Ashia Hansen (born 1971), British athlete, Olympic contestant
Bob Hansen (born 1961), American basketballer
Brendan Hansen (born 1981), American swimmer
Chad Hansen (born 1995), American football player
Chase Hansen (born 1993), American football player
Craig Hansen (born 1983), American professional baseball player
Curt Hansen (born 1964), Danish chess grand master
Dale Hansen (born 1948), American sportscaster
Dave Hansen (born 1968), American baseball player
Einar Hansen (born 1988), Faroese soccer player
Eric Hansen (born 1992), Canadian chess player
Erika Hansen (born 1970), American swimmer
Fred Hansen (born 1940), 1964 Olympic Gold medalist and world record pole vaulter
Harrison Hansen (born 1985), British based New Zealand rugby league player
Jan Knobelauch Hansen (born 1971), Danish athlete, Olympic contestant
Jannik Hansen (born 1986), Danish ice hockey Player
Jerry Hansen (born 1936), a former racing driver
Joachim Hansen (born 1979), Norwegian Mixed martial artist
Joan Hansen (born 1958), American long-distance runner
John Hansen (1924–1990), Danish footballer
John Hansen (born 1950), Scottish footballer
Johnny Hansen (born 1943), Danish footballer
Kenneth Hansen (born 1960), Swedish rallycross driver
Kevin Hansen (born 1982), American indoor volleyball player
Lars Hanssen (1903–1940), Norwegian chess player
Martin Lundgaard Hansen (born 1972), Danish badminton player, Olympic contestant
Mikkel Hansen (born 1987), Danish handballer
Niels Jørgen Hansen, Danish darts player
Niko Hansen (born 1994), Danish footballer
Nikolaj Hansen (born 1987), Danish footballer
Nikolaj Hansen (born 1993), Danish footballer
Paul Snow-Hansen (born 1990), New Zealand sailor
Per Joar Hansen (born 1965), Norwegian football coach
Phil Hansen (born 1968), American former gridiron football player
Rasmus Grønborg Hansen (born 1986), Danish football (soccer) player
Rick Hansen (born 1957), Canadian paraplegic athlete and humanitarian
Ron Hansen (born 1938), American professional baseball player
Søren Hansen (born 1974), Danish professional golfer
Stan Hansen (born 1949), American professional wrestler
Steen Hansen Danish curler
Steve Hansen (born 1959), New Zealand rugby union football player and coach
Sune Berg Hansen (born 1971), Danish chess player
Travis Hansen (born 1978), American basketball player
Trine Hansen (born 1973), Danish rower

Other
Elaine Tuttle Hansen, president of Bates College
Georg Emil Hansen (1833–1891), Danish photographer
Georg Hansen  (1904–1944), German army officer
Gesa Hansen (born 1981), German-Danish designer
Gus Hansen (born 1974), Danish professional poker player
Helmer Hanssen (1870–1956), Norwegian polar explorer
Henriette Hansen (disambiguation)
Jake Hansen (disambiguation), multiple people
John Hansen (born 1945), retired New Zealand judge
Jörmundur Ingi Hansen (born 1940), Icelandic neopagan leader and clothing retailer
Lars Peter Hansen (born 1952), American economist and econometrician
Matthew Hansen, Canadian screenwriter, author and editor
Max Hansen (1908–1990), SS officer
Monica Hansen, Norwegian model
Percy Hansen (1890–1951), Danish recipient of the Victoria Cross
Robert Hanssen (born 1944), American FBI agent convicted of spying for Russia
Sig Hansen (born 1966), American Captain of the Seattle-based crab fishing boat Northwestern, featured in the documentary Deadliest Catch
Theodore Marcus Hansen (1886–1973), Danish-American pastor, theologian, and churchman
Theophil Freiherr von Hansen (1813–1891), Danish-Austrian architect

References

See also 
 Hansen (disambiguation)
 Hanson (surname)
 Henson (name), given name and surname

Germanic-language surnames
Danish-language surnames
Norwegian-language surnames
Lists of people by surname
Patronymic surnames
Surnames from given names